Abdul Marzouk Al-Yoha (born 23 November 1968) is a Kuwaiti athlete. He competed in the men's triple jump at the 1988 Summer Olympics and the 1992 Summer Olympics.

References

External links
 

1968 births
Living people
Athletes (track and field) at the 1988 Summer Olympics
Athletes (track and field) at the 1992 Summer Olympics
Kuwaiti male triple jumpers
Olympic athletes of Kuwait
Place of birth missing (living people)
Athletes (track and field) at the 1994 Asian Games
Athletes (track and field) at the 1998 Asian Games
Asian Games competitors for Kuwait
20th-century Kuwaiti people
21st-century Kuwaiti people